The Foundling is a 1915 silent film directed by Alan Dwan. The film premiered in 1915, was lost in a fire accident shortly afterwards, and is now a lost film. It was remade as The Foundling in 1916 with the same principal cast, but with a different director, John B. O'Brien, at the helm.

Plot
Molly O (Mary Pickford) is a poor little girl whose mother died in childbirth and whose father David King (Edward Martindel) rejects her. When David departs to Italy to paint his late wife as the Madonna, Molly O is left behind in a cruel orphanage. She is beloved by the other pupils, but becomes enemies with the matron's niece Jennie (Mildred Morris). As a result, she is shipped off to live with a boardinghouse proprietress (Maggie Weston). She is treated more like a slave than as an adopted daughter and decides to run away.

Meanwhile, King returned from Italy and is now a wealthy and successful painter. He regrets having left behind his daughter and now longs for her presence. Jennie pretends to be Molly O to make profit of his wealth and is adopted by him. However, Molly O returns as well. Afraid to tell the truth, she serves as his maid.

Cast
 Mary Pickford - Molly O
 Edward Martindel - David King
 Maggie Weston - Mrs. Grimes
 Mildred Morris - Jennie
 Marcia Harris - Julia Ember
 Tammany Young - Crook

References

External links

1915 films
American black-and-white films
American silent feature films
1915 drama films
Silent American drama films
Lost American films
1915 lost films
Lost drama films
Films directed by Allan Dwan
1910s American films
1910s English-language films